Douglas K. Bryant (born January 31, 1949) is an American politician from Wheatland, Wyoming who served in the Wyoming House of Representatives from 1977 to 1983, representing Platte County as a Democrat in the 44th, 45th, and 46th Wyoming Legislatures.

Early life and education
Bryant was born in White Plains, New York on January 31, 1949. He attended Wheatland High School and the University of Wyoming, graduating from the former in 1967.

Career
Bryant was elected to the Wyoming House of Representatives to represent Platte County as a Democrat. He served in this position from 1977 to 1983.

During his time in office, Bryant served on the Aging Advisory Council, the Advisory Committee on Emergency Medical Services, and the Office of Land Use Administration. He also served on the following standing committees.
Journal (1977–1979)
Labor, Health and Social Services (1977–1983)
Agriculture, Public Lands and Water Resources (1981–1983)

Personal life
Bryant has a wife and two children.

Notes

References

External links
Official page at the Wyoming Legislature

1949 births
Living people
20th-century American politicians
Democratic Party members of the Wyoming House of Representatives
University of Wyoming alumni
People from Wheatland, Wyoming
People from White Plains, New York